Solo is a Don McLean double live album. It was recorded live in Manchester, Bristol, London, and Oxford, England.

Track listing
All tracks composed by Don McLean except where indicated.

Side One
"Magdalene Lane"
"Masters of War" (Bob Dylan)
"Wonderful Baby"
"Where Were You, Baby?" (Josh White)
"Empty Chairs"
"Geordie's Lost His Penker" (Traditional; arranged and adapted by Don McLean)
"Babylon"

Side Two
"And I Love You So"
"Mactavish Is Dead" (Traditional; arranged and adapted by Don McLean)
"Cripple Creek/Muleskinner Blues" (Traditional; arranged and adapted by Don McLean / George Vaughn, Jimmie Rodgers)
"Great Big Man"
"Bronco Bill's Lament"
"Happy Trails" (Dale Evans)
"Circus Song"
"Birthday Song"
"On the Amazon" (Vivian Ellis, Clifford Grey)

Side Three
"American Pie"
"Over the Waterfall/Arkansas Traveller" (Traditional; arranged and adapted by Don McLean)
"Homeless Brother"
"Castles in the Air"
Three Flights Up"

Side Four
"Lovesick Blues" (Irving Mills, Cliff Friend)
"Winter Has Me in Its Grip"
"The Legend of Andrew McCrew"
"Dreidel"
"Vincent"
"Till Tomorrow"

Personnel
Don McLean - acoustic guitar, banjo, vocals, executive producer
Herb Gart - producer
John Peters - producer, mixing
Greg Calbi - mastering
Jesse Henderson, Vic Maile, Gil Markle - engineer

Notes
Recorded live at Manchester, Bristol and Oxford, England.

References

1976 live albums
Don McLean live albums
United Artists Records live albums